VTV5 is a Vietnamese state-owned television network aimed at ethnic minorities and sports in Vietnam.

Since 2016, VTV5 has expanded its programs through its operated-and-owned local channels under the VTV5 banner. The first was VTV5 Tây Nam Bộ, which relaunched in 2016, originally belonged to Vietnam Television Center in Can Tho. The second is VTV5 Tây Nguyên, which broadcasts programs aimed at the Central Highlands minorities.

Although the main broadcast of VTV5 is for ethnic groups, several sports events and football matches (Bundesliga, V.League) are also live on VTV5. These sports content are also shown on VTV6 (from 2018 to 9 October 2022), and VTV2 (from 14 October 2022 to now).

References 

List of television programmes broadcast by Vietnam Television

Vietnam Television
Television channels and stations established in 2002
Television networks in Vietnam
Television in minority languages